Spencer Leigh (born circa 1963) is an English TV and film actor.

Born and raised in Liverpool, Leigh attended the King David High School, Childwall, a Jewish secondary school which also accepted non-Jewish pupils. (Other notable alumni include actor Jason Isaacs and musician Guy Chambers.) He became interested in the theatre and joined the Everyman and Playhouse Youth Theatre soon after it opened in Liverpool. Fellow theatre student David Morrissey and he were chosen by Yorkshire Television to play as two poverty-stricken kids in the drama miniseries One Summer.

Leigh has since appeared in various TV and film roles, including in several films directed by Derek Jarman, and in the premiere episode of the TV detective drama Inspector Morse, wherein he played as a university student involved in a murder investigation. In the 1980s, he was considered one of the "Brit Pack". He moved to the United States in the early 1990s, where he worked with music video producer Jake Scott, then directing TV commercials. Leigh also worked with Criterion on documentary material for the Merchant Ivory Collection.

Filmography

References

External links

Interview with Spencer Leigh (Icky)
One Summer - Interviews

1960s births
English male film actors
English male television actors
Date of birth missing (living people)
Living people
Male actors from Liverpool
People from Childwall